Abu Salih Mansur (died 915) was a Samanid prince, who served as governor during the reign of his uncle Isma'il ibn Ahmad, his cousin Ahmad Samani, and Nasr II.

Biography 
Abu Salih governed several provinces during the reign of Isma'il ibn Ahmad and Ahmad Samani. The first time he is mentioned as a governor is in 902 when he was appointed as governor of Ray by Isma'il ibn Ahmad who had conquered territory as far as Qazvin in Iran. During his governorship of Ray, he became friend with Muhammad ibn Zakariya al-Razi, a famous Persian scholar. In 910, or 911, he was appointed as governor of Sistan by Ahmad Samani. However, Abu Salih's oppressive taxation policies sparked a revolt in Sistan within in 912, led by the Khariji Muhammad ibn Hurmuz, who was a supporter of the Saffarid Amr ibn Ya'qub. Abu Salih was then taken prisoner until the rebellion was crushed by a Samanid army under Husain ibn 'Ali Marvarrudhi in 913. 'Amr was sent to Samarkand, while the other rebel leaders were killed. Simjur al-Dawati then replaced Mansur as governor of Sistan.

In 914, Mansur was appointed governor of Khorasan, but anarchy unleashed by the death of Ahmad ibn Ismail and the ascent to the throne of the 8-year-old child Nasr II. Mansur's father, Ishaq ibn Ahmad, revolted at Samarkand, while Mansur proclaimed himself as Emir of Nishapur, and several other cities.
He died a natural death in Nishapur probably in 915, before an army sent against him led by Hammuya ibn Ali reached the city.

References

Sources 
Bosworth, C. E. "Abu Saleh Mansur." Encyclopedia Iranica. 30 December 2013. <http://www.iranicaonline.org/articles/abu-saleh-mansur-b>
 

915 deaths
Year of birth unknown
Samanids
10th-century Iranian people
Samanid generals
Samanid governors of Khorasan
Rebellions against the Samanid Empire
Governors of Sistan
Governors of Ray
Samanid governors